is a passenger railway station located in the city of Marugame, Kagawa Prefecture, Japan. It is operated by JR Shikoku and has the station number "Y11".

Lines
The station is served by the JR Shikoku Yosan Line and is located 30.1 km from the beginning of the line at Takamatsu. Yosan line local, Rapid Sunport, and Nanpū Relay services stop at the station. In addition, there are several trains each day running a local service on the Seto-Ōhashi Line which stop at the station. These trains also stop at Sanuki-Shioya.

Layout
Sanuki-Shioya Station consists of two side platforms serving two tracks. There is no station building nor weather shelters on the platform. However part of both platforms run under a road overpass bridge and this affords waiting passengers some shelter from the elements. The station is unstaffed, but each platform has a "Tickets Corner" (small shelter housing an automatic ticket vending machine). Bicycle parking is available underneath the road bridge. Ramps lead up to the platforms from the access roads.

Adjacent stations

History
Sanuki-Shioya Station opened on 27 January 1952, as an additional stop on the existing Yosan Line. At this time, the station was operated by Japanese National Railways (JNR). With the privatization of JNR on 1 April 1987, control of the station passed to JR Shikoku.

Surrounding area
Okura Industry Head Office Factory
Fushimi Pharmaceutical Co., Ltd. Head Office Factory

See also
 List of railway stations in Japan

References

External links
Station timetable

Railway stations in Kagawa Prefecture
Railway stations in Japan opened in 1952
Marugame, Kagawa